The 1976–77 Eredivisie season was the 17th season of the Eredivisie, the top level of ice hockey in the Netherlands. Seven teams participated in the league, and the Heerenveen Flyers won the championship.

Regular season
 
 (* The Utrecht Hunters had two points deducted)

External links
Nederlandse IJshockey Bond

Neth
Eredivisie (ice hockey) seasons